The 42nd New Zealand Parliament was a term of the New Zealand Parliament. Its composition was determined by the 1987 election, and it sat until the 1990 election.

The 42nd Parliament was the second (and final) term of the controversial fourth Labour Party government. Initially, the only other party in the 42nd Parliament was the National Party, with the Democratic Party having lost the two seats it held in the 41st Parliament. Later, a dissident Labour MP, Jim Anderton, would found the NewLabour Party in 1989. Due to internal disputes within the Labour Party, there were three Prime Ministers during the 42nd Parliament: David Lange, Geoffrey Palmer, and Mike Moore.

The 42nd Parliament consisted of ninety-seven representatives. At the time, this was the highest number of representatives that Parliament had had, although it would later be exceeded. All of these representatives were chosen by single-member geographical electorates, including four Māori electorates.

Electoral boundaries for the 42nd Parliament

Overview of seats
The table below shows the number of MPs in each party following the 1987 election and at dissolution:

Notes
The Working Government majority is calculated as all Government MPs less all other parties.

Initial composition of the 42nd Parliament

Changes during term
There were no by-elections held during the term of the 42nd Parliament.
Jim Anderton, the Labour MP for Sydenham, quit the Labour Party in protest in 1989 over the economic reforms, known as Rogernomics, of Roger Douglas, the Minister of Finance. He established the NewLabour Party.

Notes

References

New Zealand parliaments